Hypericum nagasawae is a species of the large genus Hypericum (St. John's wort) in the Hypericaceae family. It is native to Taiwan.

Taxonomy 
The species was described by Bunzō Hayata in 1911.

References

External links 
 Plant illustrations

nagasawae
Flora of Taiwan
Plants described in 1911